Newbridge Heights Public School (NHPS) is a public school in Chipping Norton, New South Wales.

Campus
The school has one oval (with a multi-purpose court for a range of sports including basketball and netball), a concrete cricket pitch, a sandpit for long jump and 2 quadrangles (for K-2 and 3-6). It also has a number of classroom blocks and demountables, some of which are built as recently as 2018.

Other Information 
The school has an opportunity class as well as an 'enrichment' class for every year with mainstream classes as well. The opportunity class contains grades 5 and 6. To get into an opportunity class, students will have to take an opportunity class test in Year 4. Once the test is marked and reviewed, the student will receive an email regarding the outcome.

References

      

Public primary schools in Sydney
1977 establishments in Australia